Club Melilla Baloncesto is a professional basketball team based in Melilla that plays in the LEB league. This is the only team in Spain that played all LEB seasons.

The team's home arena is the Pabellón Javier Imbroda Ortiz (formerly known as Ciudad de Melilla), with a capacity of up to 3,800 spectators.

History
Club Melilla Baloncesto was founded in 1991 as a merge of Baloncesto Melilla and CB Gran Tercio. In its first season, played in the second division with the name of Unicaja Melilla as an affiliated team of Liga ACB club Unicaja. Despite being relegated, remained in the league after its expansion to 31 teams, that allowed the club to continue playing in the second division, indeed when the Liga EBA was created.

In 1996, Melilla became one of the founding clubs of the Liga LEB. In 1999, the club achieved their first title by winning the Copa Príncipe de Asturias after defeating Menorca Bàsquet in the final, and is close to promote to the Liga ACB, but was eliminated in the last round of the playoffs by Breogán Universidade.

In 2001, Melilla clinched their segund Copa Príncipe de Asturias, this time beating Bàsquet Manresa in the Final Four played at home. After several years of consolidation in the league, in 2008 the club reached again the last round of the promotion playoffs but lost to Lucentum Alicante in the last round. One year later, despite winning their third Cup and despite being the top seeded team, was eliminated in the semifinals of the promotion playoffs to Ford Burgos.

In 2013 the club suffered their first relegation ever from the LEB Oro, but remained in the league after achieving a vacant place. Three years later, in 2016, the club clinched the promotion to Liga ACB, but resigned to join the league resigned to promote due to the impossibility to fulfill the requirements.

Players

Current roster

Depth chart

Season by season

Trophies and awards

Trophies
Copa Príncipe de Asturias: (3)
1999, 2001, 2010

Individual awards
All-LEB Oro Team
Eduardo Hernández-Sonseca – 2016

References

External links
Federación Española de Baloncesto
Melilla Baloncesto Official Site

Melilla
Melilla
Baloncesto
Melilla
1991 establishments in Spain